The Cuchilla de Haedo (Haedo Range) is a low range of hills located in the north-northwest of Uruguay, to the west of Tacuarembó, and running southwest toward Paysandú. It climbs no more than 500 m in height. This ridge is separated from the Cuchilla Grande to the south by the Río Negro valley.

See also
 Cerro Batoví

References

Hills of Uruguay